Miss Philippines Earth 2007 was the 7th edition of the Miss Philippines Earth pageant. It was held on April 29, 2007, at the University of the Philippines Theater in Quezon City, Philippines.

The event was broadcast by ABS-CBN Network in the Philippines and The Filipino Channel internationally. Catherine Untalan, Miss Philippines Earth 2006 and 2nd Runner-up Miss Earth 2006 crowned her successor Jeanne Angeles Harn as Miss Philippines Earth 2007 at the conclusion of the event. Harn won against 22 other candidates and became the representative of Philippines in the international Miss Earth 2007 beauty pageant.

The pageant
The twenty-three candidates that competed for the Miss Philippines 2007 title were formally presented at the poolside of Hotel Intercontinental in Makati on April 21, 2007.  The ladies introduced themselves and spoke about their environmental platforms to the media. The regions of the Philippines and some Filipino communities abroad were represented by candidates who won in separate searches.

Results
Color keys

Special awards
The following is the list of the special award winners:

 Major Special Awards
 Minor/Sponsor Special Awards

Candidates
The following is the list of the official contestants of Miss Philippines Earth 2007 representing various regions in the Philippines:

Judges
The judging panel consisted of twelve judges as follows:

See also
:Miss Earth 2003

References

External links
Official Website
Lil' Earth Angels Official Website

2007
2007 beauty pageants
2007 in the Philippines
April 2007 events in the Philippines